The Architecture of Libya encompasses various architectural styles that exist in Libya.

Roman 
The archaeological sites of Cyrene, Leptis Magna, and Sabratha are UNESCO World Heritage sites.

Islamic 
The Sidi Darghut Mosque and Gurgi Mosque are examples of Ottoman architecture in Libya.

Italian period 

During the Italian Libya period, several buildings were constructed including the Tripoli Cathedral, Benghazi Cathedral, and Governor's Palace, Asmara.

Modern 
Skyscrapers such as Tripoli Tower, Corinthia Hotel Tripoli, and JW Marriott Tripoli were built in the 21st century.

References 

Architecture in Libya